Bosque School is an independent, co-educational, college preparatory school for grades 6–12 founded in 1994. The school sits on a  site along the Rio Grande bosque in Albuquerque, New Mexico. Surrounded by the riparian forest of the bosque, the school emphasizes environmental science, the arts, and service learning. With 550 students and 60 teaching faculty, there is a 9:1 student/faculty ratio. An average class size at Bosque School is 16 students. The school is accredited by the Independent Schools Association of the Southwest and is a member of NAIS, NACAC, NMAA, APIAL and other associations. Bosque School was voted the #1 private school in Albuquerque by the 2020 Albuquerque Journal Reader's Choice Awards. The annual summer camp program at the school, Bosque Summer, was voted #1 at the same awards.

History 

Bosque School was established in 1994. Dr. Gary Gruber was appointed as the first principal.

In August 1995, Bosque Preparatory School opened in a rented space in Albuquerque's Northeast Heights with 72 sixth and seventh grade students and Dr. Gary Gruber as its first school principal.

In 1996, the Bosque Ecosystem Monitoring Program (BEMP) began as a collaboration between the Biology Department of the University of New Mexico and the Black Institute for Environmental Studies at Bosque School.

In 1998, President Gerald R. Ford and his family assisted in launching the school's first capital campaign, through which almost $1 million was secured to begin construction on a permanent site.

On March 28, 1999, permanent site construction started alongside the bosque.

In 2000, Bosque School relocated to a new campus at Coors and Montano, NW, near to a 100-acre forest. The campus was created with three structures and a gym bubble.

In spring 2001, Bosque School's first senior class graduated with eleven students.

On October 25, 2001, Bosque School dedicated two newly constructed buildings to the Peggie Ann Findlay Performing Arts Center and the Gerald and Betty Ford Library. The arts center name reflects one of the school founders' Dr. Findlay’s appreciation for the theater and fine arts. The Gerald and Betty Ford Library was named after the 38th president and first lady of the United States, who were also the school supporters.

In 2004, a 10,000-square-foot science building was given to the school. The Montano Bridge interpretive art panels, built by architect Robert Peters, featuring Bosque student artwork and Spanish translations, have been presented. The same year, intercultural exchange with Reina Elizabeth College in Mexico City started. 

In 2006, during the tenth year of Bosque School, the Budagher family donated $3 million to expand the arts center, adding 15,500 square feet of space for dining, a performance hall, and art classrooms. On April 10, 2006, Bosque School started construction of Budaght Hall.

In 2011, the school created the Alumni Walkway, which allows graduates to leave their imprint with a personalized brick.

In 2013, a team of Bosque School senior students led by Satwest President Brian Barnett sent the first commercial text message to space using a Satwest satellite phone inside one of eight payloads carried by the UP Aerospace SpaceLoft 8 rocket. The flight was funded by NASA's Flight Opportunities Program.

In 2019, Dr. Jessie Barrie was appointed as the fourth principal of Bosque School.

Curriculum
When students enter middle school (6th–8th grades) at Bosque, they take a full schedule of required courses including English, Spanish, Math, Social Studies, Science, fine art, performing art, service learning, and physical education. As students enter the upper school (9th–12th grades), they are required to take four years of English, four years of History, three-four years of science, three-four years of math, two years of Spanish, two years of Latin, two years of performing or fine art, four years of service learning, and two years of physical education or equivalent interscholastic athletics. Upper School students are also required to take a college seminar course and complete a college level year long senior thesis.

College Matriculation
Since its first graduating class in 2001, one-hundred percent of all Bosque students have matriculated to college receiving, on average, $12,000 in merit scholarships. Bosque alumni are currently attending colleges and universities across the United States and abroad. Of the school's 60 graduating seniors in the class of 2019, students matriculated to over 30 schools, including: Stanford University, the University of Chicago, Pomona College, Northwestern University, University of California, Berkeley, Barnard College, Bryn Mawr College, Rice University, Georgetown University and Washington University in St. Louis.

Bosque Ecosystem Monitoring Program(BEMP)
Given its location in a vast environmental ecosystem, Bosque students are leaders in becoming good stewards of the land. The Black Institute for Environmental Studies at Bosque School builds connections between students, community, and the Rio Grande and its riverside forest and watershed through research, education and action. The Black Institute programs include; the Bosque Ecosystem Monitoring Program (BEMP), The Cebrin Goodman Youth Leadership and the Environment Project, citizen science, and wildlife conservation. These environmental projects involved over 6,000 students and teachers from Bosque School and other private, public, pueblo and home schools.

Campus

The campus sits on 23 acres of land directly adjacent to the riparian forest supported by the Rio Grande. It has numerous buildings, including: Peggie Ann Findlay Performing Arts Center, Budagher Hall, Upper and Middle School Buildings, a gymnasium, the Gerald Ford Library, and the 15,500 square foot "Schoolhouse".

Archeology On Campus
During an expansion project in early 2007, an ancient Native American pueblo was found on the southern end of the campus. To preserve this archaeological discovery, the tennis courts and the Klaus Weber Championship Soccer Field were moved slightly to preserve the land. This ancient pueblo site is used as an educational resource in history classes.

Notable alumni 
Forrest Goodluck, actor

References 

High schools in Albuquerque, New Mexico
Private high schools in New Mexico
Private middle schools in New Mexico
Preparatory schools in New Mexico
Independent Schools Association of the Southwest
Educational institutions established in 1994
1994 establishments in New Mexico